The Agriculture Building at the University of Arkansas is a building on the University's campus in Fayetteville, Arkansas. The building was added to the National Register of Historic Places in 1992.

History
The Agriculture Building and Engineering Building were both built using the same funding from the Arkansas Legislature. Completed in 1927, the Agriculture Building hosted a library, the agronomy, horticulture, plant pathology, rural economics and sociology, and entomology departments, in addition to offices. A new Plant Pathology building was built in 1978, taking some of the aforementioned departments. The two buildings are connected by a skywalk. It now contains the agribusiness and economics, agricultural and extension education, agricultural communications, and entomology departments.

See also
National Register of Historic Places listings in Washington County, Arkansas

References

External links
 U of A Agriculture Building profile
 University of Arkansas

University of Arkansas buildings
University and college buildings on the National Register of Historic Places in Arkansas
University and college buildings completed in 1927
National Register of Historic Places in Fayetteville, Arkansas